Rio Grande City is a city in and the county seat of Starr County, Texas. The population was 14,411 at the time of the 2020 census. The city is connected to Camargo, Tamaulipas, via the Rio Grande City–Camargo International Bridge. The city is situated within the Rio Grande Valley.

History

The area around Rio Grande City was first settled on the southern bank of the river as Camargo. The northern bank was developedstill under the name Camargoin 1846 when it was used as a supply depot for the army invading Mexico as part of the Mexican–American War. The area developed as the furthest point up the Rio Grande regularly accessible to the era's steamboats. During the early stages of the war, the American soldier Henry Clay Davis married Hilaria de la Garza Falcon, a resident of Camargo to the south and the heiress to the land on which Rio Grande City now sits. At the end of the war, Davis set out to organize this area into a formal city, breaking up the land into plots. This was changed to Rio Grande City to encourage investors and settlers. From its founding in 1848 until the Texas Mexican Railroad opened up in 1883, Rio Grande City was one of the most significant hubs of trade between Texas and Mexico and was one of the major contemporary contributors to the American romanticized concept of the "Wild West".

Famous early residents include Joshua H. Bean, brother of Judge Roy Bean, and the first mayor of San Diego, CA; Orlando C. Phelps, one of the few surviving members of the Mier Expedition; Edwin R. Rainwater, hero of the Texas Revolution; Edward R. Hord, an influential early South Texas statesman; and John L. Haynes, a native Virginian politician and writer who was an outspoken anti-secessionist and strong proponent of Mexican-American rights.

Rio Grande City contains a historic district. One structure, the La Borde House, dates back to 1899. A French riverboat trader and merchant commissioned its design in Paris, had it refined by San Antonio architects, and then had it constructed along Main St. It was renovated around the early 1980s and now functions as a hotel, complete with a patio, parlor, shaded verandas, and restaurant.

In the 1970s and into the 1980s, federal law enforcement officials concentrated their anti-drug smuggling efforts on Starr County.

In spite of Rio Grande City's rich architectural heritage, many buildings in the old downtown district are abandoned, dilapidated, or crumbling. While there are a good number of small shops and businesses operating in the district, most new development and commerce takes place in new shopping centers outside of the old downtown neighborhood.

In May 1993, Rio Grande City was officially incorporated as a municipal corporation (i.e. city).

Rio Grande City has seen rapid growth in the past years. In August 2006, an HEB Plus (the regional supermarket chain of south Texas) was opened just east of the historic downtown and Fort Ringgold.

Fort Ringgold
Ringgold Barracks were established at Davis Landing on 26 October 1848 by the 1st US Infantry under the command of Captain J.H. La Motte, in honor of Major Ringgold who was mortally wounded at the Battle of Palo Alto. Troops were withdrawn on 3 March 1859 but reoccupied again on 29 December 1859 during the Cortina War. Abandoned again at the start of the Civil War in 1861, but reoccupied again by US forces in 1865. The fort was active until 1944 when the property was sold to the Rio Grande City public schools system Units stationed here included the 1st Infantry (Mounted Dragoons), 7th and 28th Infantry Regiments, 3rd Texas Volunteers, the 9th, 10th and 12th Cavalry Regiments, the 9th and 10th being composed of Buffalo Soldiers. Besides the parade ground, several post buildings survive as school facilities. These include the sentry and guard houses, barracks, officers quarters, the bakery, hospital and post headquarters, situated along Ringgold Avenue, Lee Circle, 12th Cavalry and F Troop streets. The Rio Grande City United States Army Reserve Center is the only remaining military presence at the Fort Ringgold area.

Geography

Rio Grande City is located at  (26.380667, −98.818364).

The city gained area prior to the 2010 census giving it a total area of 11.4 square miles (30.0 km2), all land.

Education

Rio Grande City is served by the Rio Grande City Grulla Independent School District (formerly Rio Grande City Consolidated Independent School District).

Immaculate Conception School of the Roman Catholic Diocese of Brownsville, founded in 1884 and the only Catholic school in Starr County, provides a faith-based Pre-K through eighth-grade education to approximately 250 students each year.

Notable people
Ricardo Sanchez, Lieutenant General and commander of U.S. forces in Iraq; retired from the United States Army

Demographics

2020 census

As of the 2020 United States census, there were 15,317 people, 3,873 households, and 2,880 families residing in the city.

2010 census
As of the 2010 Census Rio Grande City had a population of 13,834. The median age was 30. The racial makeup of the population was 92.1% white (4.7% claiming to not be Hispanic or Latino), 0.2% Black, 0.3% Native American, 0.8% Asian, 5.5% from some other race and 1.1% from two or more races. 94.3% of the population was Hispanic or Latino of any race with 88.2% of the population describing themselves as ethnically Mexican.

2000 census
As of the census of 2000, there were 11,923 people, 3,333 households, and 2,796 families residing in the city. The population density was 1,571.6 people per square mile (606.5/km2). There were 3,846 housing units at an average density of 506.9 per square mile (195.6/km2). The racial makeup of the city was 82.97% White, 0.30% African American, 0.44% Native American, 1.11% Asian, 0.01% Pacific Islander, 12.51% from other races, and 2.67% from two or more races. Hispanic or Latino of any race were 95.89% of the population.

There were 3,333 households, out of which 47.0% had children under the age of 18 living with them, 60.1% were married couples living together, 19.8% had a female householder with no husband present, and 16.1% were non-families. 14.6% of all households were made up of individuals, and 7.5% had someone living alone who was 65 years of age or older. The average household size was 3.47 and the average family size was 3.86.

In the city, the population was spread out, with 33.1% under the age of 18, 11.4% from 18 to 24, 27.4% from 25 to 44, 17.0% from 45 to 64, and 11.2% who were 65 years of age or older. The median age was 29 years. For every 100 females, there were 93.4 males. For every 100 females age 18 and over, there were 88.5 males.

The median income for a household in the city was $19,853, and the median income for a family was $21,363. Males had a median income of $20,245 versus $14,984 for females. The per capita income for the city was $9,684. About 40.4% of families and 44.1% of the population were below the poverty line, including 57.3% of those under age 18 and 33.7% of those age 65 or over.

References

External links

 City of Rio Grande
 Rio Grande Herald newspaper hosted by the Portal to Texas History.

Cities in Starr County, Texas
County seats in Texas
Micropolitan areas of Texas
Lower Rio Grande Valley
Populated places established in 1848
1848 establishments in Texas
Cities in Texas
Texas populated places on the Rio Grande